Newside is a small hamlet in Lehigh County, Pennsylvania, located four miles west of the town of Neffs, at the corner of Park Avenue and Newside Road. 

Newside is part of the Lehigh Valley metropolitan area.

Roadways in the area
Park Avenue is a major thoroughfare for citizens of the nearby communities, as it connects PA Route 873 with the outlying towns along the Blue Mountain. It also serves Bake Oven Knob State Park.

Washington Street parallels Park Avenue and PA Route 309. It is a very important local alternate to the latter for accessing the locales to the north.

Newside Road runs perpendicular from Park Avenue to 309.

Local attractions
Heidelberg Heights, the main subdivision of residences in Newside is home to an annual yard sale in September that attracts many people of all ages from miles around.

Nearby communities
Schnecksville
Neffs
Pleasant Corners
New Tripoli

Unincorporated communities in Pennsylvania